HBO's children animated TV series The Country Mouse and the City Mouse Adventures had two seasons, each with 26 episodes, totaling 52 episodes aired between March 1, 1998 and October 27, 1999. The following list informs the number, title, plot location and airing date of each episode. In this list, a plot summary is also included in most but not all episodes.

Series overview

Episodes

Season 1 (1998)
This season used traditional cel-animation, and was produced in 1997 and aired in 1998.

Season 2 (1999)
This season used digital ink and paint, and was produced in 1998 and aired in 1999.

References

External links

Lists of Canadian children's animated television series episodes
Lists of French animated television series episodes